This is a list of notable events relating to the environment in 1973. They relate to environmental law, conservation, environmentalism and environmental issues.

Events

Summer 
 Several thousand pounds of polybrominated biphenyls were accidentally mixed with livestock feed that was distributed to farms in Michigan, because the plant also produced a feed precursor ingredient, magnesium oxide, which was sold to the feed manufacturer. Adverse reproductive-system effects continued 40 years later to be found in the grandchildren of those who consumed tainted farm products.

August 
The snail darter controversy delayed the construction of the Tellico Dam on the Little Tennessee River in the United States when the snail darter fish was discovered in the river.

November 
The International Agreement on the Conservation of Polar Bears was signed in Oslo, Norway.

December 
The Endangered Species Act was signed into law in the United States by President Richard Nixon.

See also

Human impact on the environment
List of environmental issues

References